The Scottish Mortgage Investment Trust Book Awards, formerly known as the Scottish Arts Council Book Awards, were a series of literary awards in Scotland that ran from 1972 to 2013. Organised by Creative Scotland (formerly the Scottish Arts Council), and sponsored by the Scottish Mortgage Investment Trust. There were four categories: fiction; poetry; literary non-fiction; and first books. The winners in each category were selected by a panel of judges, and a public vote decided the overall winner of the Book of the Year award. The category winners received £5,000 each, with the Book of the Year winner receiving a further £25,000.

Book of the Year winners

1994 Andrew Cowan, Pig
1995 Ali Smith, Free Love and Other Stories
2001 Ali Smith, Hotel World
2004 James Robertson, Joseph Knight
2005 Kathleen Jamie, The Tree House
2006 James Meek, The People's Act of Love
2007 Kirsty Gunn, The Boy and the Sea
2008 Edwin Morgan, A Book of Lives
2009 James Kelman, Kieron Smith, Boy
2010 Donald Worster, A Passion for Nature: The Life of John Muir
2011 Jackie Kay, Red Dust Road
2012 Janice Galloway, All Made Up
2013 Gavin Francis, Empire Antarctica

See also
Saltire Society Literary Awards

References

External links
Scottish Mortgage Investment Trust Book Awards, in partnership with Creative Scotland

Scottish literary awards
Scottish awards